The Panhandle Conference is a conference within the National Junior College Athletic Association (NJCAA) Region 8. The conference consists of four state colleges and one community college located in Florida.

Members
Member institutions are Chipola College, Pensacola State College, Northwest Florida State College, Gulf Coast State College, and Tallahassee Community College.

See also
National Junior College Athletic Association (NJCAA)
Florida State College Activities Association (FCSAA - the governing body of NJCAA Region 8)
Mid-Florida Conference, also in Region 8
Southern Conference, also in Region 8
Suncoast Conference, also in Region 8

References

External links
FSCAA/NJCAA Region 8 website
NJCAA Website

NJCAA conferences
College sports in Florida
North Florida